The 1937 Liga Bet season was the second tier league of the Palestine League organized by the EIFA. The North division was won by Hapoel Herzliya, while the southern division was won by Maccabi Nes Tziona. The two divisional winners played for one allocated place in the top division, with Maccabi Nes Tziona winning the play-off. However, Hapoel Herzliya was promoted as well by the league and cup committee.

North division

South division
Six clubs played in this division:
Bar Kochva Jerusalem
Hapoel Rishon LeZion
Maccabi Gedera
Maccabi Nes Tziona (winners, advance to playoff)
Atid Tel Aviv
Hapoel Jerusalem

Play-off

References

Liga Bet seasons
Palestine
Palestine
2
2